Sarcocheilichthys lacustris is a species of cyprinid fish found in Asia.

References

Sarcocheilichthys
Taxa named by Benedykt Dybowski
Fish described in 1872